Boughton may refer to:

People
Boughton (surname)
Boughton Baronets, titled English family line

Places

England

Boughton, Cheshire
Boughton, Norfolk
Boughton, Northamptonshire that gives it name to:
Boughton House, a country house in Northamptonshire
Boughton railway station, planned terminus of the Northampton & Lamport Railway
Boughton, Nottinghamshire
 Boughton Aluph, Kent
 Boughton Green, Kent
 Boughton Lees, Kent
 Boughton Malherbe, Kent
 Boughton Monchelsea, Kent
of which Boughton Green is a part
 Boughton Street, Kent
 Boughton under Blean, Kent

Wales
 Broughton, Vale of Glamorgan

See also